Social nudity is somewhat accepted in Seattle and perhaps similarly treated as in other large communities of the West Coast region, such as San Francisco and Los Angeles. There are a few non-sexualized clothing-optional and topfree events, including cycling.

In 2005, the Seattle Post-Intelligencer reported that "Parks spokeswoman Dewey Potter said the parks department does not consider simply being naked illegal, and she doesn't remember any complaints during the 13 years she's worked for the city about nudity in the parks". Seattle bans indecent exposure if it is "likely to cause reasonable affront or alarm", exempting breastfeeding or expressing breast milk.

Examples
Seattle Post-Intelligencer Breaks the story of Seattle Parks & Recreation public nudity rule proposal, its relationship to WNBR Seattle. Quotes by Dewey Potter (Parks), Mark Storey (NAC), Daniel Johnson (WNBR). (Editor's Note: This story has been altered. Earlier versions, based on incorrect information from the Seattle Parks and Recreation department, inaccurately described what happened to 23 nude bicyclists during a ride in July.)
West Seattle Blog
Nude & Natural (N) magazine covered Benham Gallery and Seattle Art Museum visit in issue 28.2, Winter 2008. "Naked Cyclists' Artful Idyll" by Marie Gunn. Pages 61–62. Discussion of Daniel's idea to collaborate with Marita Holdaway of Benham Gallery in Seattle.
Nude & Natural (N), Seattle's Solstice Spectacular/Body Positive Creativity Abounds... at the Fremont Summer Solstice Parade by John Cornicello & Daniel Johnson. Also Guerilla Nudity/Wave Makers: Introducing the Body Freedom Collaborative by Mark Storey. Issue 23.1, Autumn 2003.

See also

References

Culture of Seattle
Tourist attractions in Washington (state)
Naturism in the United States